Willy Evensen (31 March 1919 – 22 November 1997) was a Norwegian rower. He competed in the men's coxed four event at the 1948 Summer Olympics.

References

1919 births
1997 deaths
Norwegian male rowers
Olympic rowers of Norway
Rowers at the 1948 Summer Olympics
Rowers from Oslo